This is a discography for the Gospel Music Hall of Fame inductee Mylon LeFevre.

Albums

Mylon and Broken Heart

Compilations
1988: Greatest Hits Mylon  and Broken Heart (Word)
1992: A Decade of Love (Star Song)
2007: The Definitive Collection (Word)

Charting singles

As a member of The LeFevres
1960: The LeFevres In Stereo (Sing Records)
1965: Sing the Gospel (Sing Records)
1965: Songs of Happiness (Sing)
1965: You Need the Lord (Sing)
1966: Without Him (Sing)
1972: The LeFevres Present Pierce & Mylon Lefevre (from earlier recordings)

As a member of The Stamps Quartet
1967: Music Music Music (Skylite)
1968: J.D. Sumner & the Colorful Stamps (Skylite)

Appearances on other albums
1974: Third Annual Pipe Dream – Atlanta Rhythm Section (Polydor)
1975: Sammy Johns – Sammy Johns
1975: Tommy (soundtrack) – (chorus) (Polydor)
1976: Volunteer Jam – The Charlie Daniels Band
1980: Seeds of Change – Kerry Livgren (Renaissance)
1984: Superjammin''' – Earl Scruggs (CBS)
1990: Love Broke Thru – Phil Keaggy
1990: Our Christmas – various artists "O Holy Night" (Word)
1992: A Few Good Men – Gaither Vocal Band (title song) (Star Song)
1994: I Was On His Mind – Kenneth Copeland "Without Him" (KCP)
1996: Shelter – Gary Chapman "Gospel Ship" (Reunion)
1998: In His Presence – Phil Driscoll
1998: Step Up to the Microphone – Newsboys (Star Song)
2014: Sun and Shield – Peter Furler Band (New Day/Platinum Pop)

Video
1985: The CAUSE — "Do Something Now" (Myrrh)
1985: Mylon LeFevre and Broken Heart: 4 Concept Videos/Interview (Myrrh)
1988: Mylon Lefevre and Broken Heart: Sheep In Wolves Clothing Live (Myrrh)
1992: Mylon and Broken Heart — Crank It Up (Star Song)

Gaither Homecoming Video performances
1996: Ryman Gospel Reunion — "Without Him"
2004: Turn Your Radio On 
2009: Joy In My Heart'' — "Without Him"

Discographies of American artists
Christian music discographies